South Range High School is a public high school in Beaver Township, Ohio, United States. It is the only high school in the South Range Local School District. Their athletic teams compete as the South Range Raiders in the Northeast 8 Athletic Conference and the Ohio High School Athletic Association.

Athletics
The following is an alphabetical list of sports offered by the high school.
Baseball
Basketball
Cross Country
Football
Golf
Soccer
Softball
Track and Field
Volleyball
Wrestling

Ohio High School Athletic Association State Championships
Baseball - 2018
 Football - 2022

References

External links
 District Website

High schools in Mahoning County, Ohio
Public high schools in Ohio